Alexandra Fusai and Nathalie Tauziat were the defending champions and won in the final 6–3, 3–6, 6–4 against Anna Kournikova and Larisa Savchenko.

Seeds
Champion seeds are indicated in bold text while text in italics indicates the round in which those seeds were eliminated.

 Yayuk Basuki /  Caroline Vis (semifinals)
 Alexandra Fusai /  Nathalie Tauziat (champions)
 Anna Kournikova /  Larisa Savchenko (final)
 Lisa Raymond /  Rennae Stubbs (first round)

Draw

External links
 1998 EA-Generali Ladies Linz Doubles Draw

1998 WTA Tour